CDC NSW is an Australian bus operator in New South Wales, Australia. It is an umbrella brand of ComfortDelGro Australia established in 2017 to cover the latter's New South Wales operations, some of which had been owned by ComfortDelGro since 2005. It was subsequently established as a legal entity (company) in 2019.

The CDC NSW operations do not include the CDC Broken Hill, even though the operation is located in New South Wales. Together with CDC Mildura, they are managed by CDC Victoria.

From April 2023, the CDC NSW brand will replace the branding of its Hillsbus and Forest Coach Lines operations in Sydney.

History
In 2016, Singaporean company ComfortDelGro bought out ComfortDelGro Cabcharge from its joint venture partner Cabcharge and renamed the company to ComfortDelGro Australia. The CDC NSW brand began to appear in early 2017 as an umbrella branding of ComfortDelGro Australia's operations in New South Wales, which at the time consisted of Hillsbus, Blue Mountains Transit, Hunter Valley Buses, QCity Transit, Transborder Express and Charterplus. The logo was introduced on its website in April 2017.

In following few years since, ComfortDelGro Australia acquired a number of bus companies in Australia, some in New South Wales such as Forest Coach Lines. However, until 2023, the majority of the New South Wales operations were not rebranded, unlike its Victorian counterparts which had been rebranded to CDC in 2014.

CDC NSW became the largest commuter bus operator in 2018/2019, with the acquisition of Forest Coach Lines, Coastal Liner and Blanch's Bus Company in that period.

In March 2022, ComfortDelGro Australia announced it intended to rebrand all of its operations in New South Wales under the CDC NSW brand. Following it successfully tendering to continue operating regions 4 and 14 in Sydney, ComfortDelGro Australia announced that its Forest Coach Lines (Sydney only) and Hillsbus subsidiaries will both be rebranded when the new contracts commence in April and May 2023.

Operations

Hillsbus 

Hillsbus a bus operator who operates bus services in the Hills District in Sydney. It was one of the first companies to be bought by ComfortDelGro Cabcharge in 2005.
Since 2005, Hillsbus' services have formed Sydney Bus Region 4. In August 2013 Hillsbus successfully tendered to operate the Region 4 services for another five years from August 2014.

Hillsbus will be rebranded as CDC NSW when the new contract for Region 4 commences in April 2023.

Hunter Valley Buses 

Hunter Valley Buses is a bus operator who operates bus, coach and charter services in the Central Coast and Hunter regions of New South Wales. Previously known as Blue Ribbon, it was one of the first companies to be bought by ComfortDelGro Cabcharge in 2005. Since 2008, Hunter Valley Buses' services have formed Outer Sydney Metropolitan Bus Regions 2 and 4. In August 2018, its service area expanded to include Outer Sydney Metropolitan Bus Region 11 after the purchase of Coastal Liner.

CDC Travel 
CDC Travel is CDC's bus charter division for its Sydney and Blue Mountains operations. Initially established as Charterplus in 2008 to centralise the charter operations between the Hillsbus depots, this was expanded to the Westbus depots in 2009. It organises charters for the CDC group, CDC rail bus workings, as well as CDC's special event commitments. Charterplus was renamed CDC Travel in November 2018. Originally based at Bonnyrigg, all Sydney CDC Travel vehicles are now based at the St Marys depot with some vehicles based in the Blue Mountains.

As of July 2022, CDC Travel operates 57 buses transferred from both the New South Wales and Victorian operations.

Blue Mountains Transit 

In August 2014, CDC purchased Blue Mountains Bus Company with 101 buses. It operated depots in Emu Plains, Leura and Valley Heights. Founded in 1951 as Pearce Omnibus, it operated services in the lower Blue Mountains. In 1999, it expanded with the purchase of Katoomba-Leura Bus Service, followed in 2002 by Blue Mountains Bus Co. On 1 December 2014, CDC formally took over the operations of Blue Mountains Bus Company and rebranded it as Blue Mountains Transit.

Blue Mountains Transit now operates 73 buses as of July 2022, across the same 3 depots, which includes the recent additions of 14 ex-StationLink buses in July 2019.

CDC Canberra 

In September 2012, CDC purchased Deane's Transit Group which comprised Deane's Buslines which operates local services in Queanbeyan and into Canberra, and Transborder Express which runs services between Yass, Murrumbateman, Hall and Canberra. Both brands also operate school services within their service region. On 8 July 2013, Deane's Buslines was rebranded as Qcity Transit.

As of July 2022, the combined QCity Transit and Transborder Express fleet consists of 149 buses.

In January 2023, Qcity Transit and Transborder Express were rebranded as CDC Canberra.

Forest Coach Lines 

Forest Coach Lines is a bus and coach operator which operates in the Northern Suburbs of Sydney, the Mid North Coast, and North West Slopes regions in New South Wales. Since 2005, Forest Coach Lines' services in Sydney have formed Sydney Bus Region 14. It was acquired by ComfortDelGro in August 2018.

In October 2021, CDC merged its newly acquired school bus business from KA & VK Stubbs Pty Ltd into its Forest Coach Lines business in Narrabri and Wee Waa.

The Sydney (Region 14) operations will be rebranded as CDC NSW when the new contract for Region 14 commences in May 2023.

Blanch's Bus Company 
Blanch's Bus Company, established in 1976, operates scheduled route and school bus services in the Ballina, Lennox Head, Byron Bay and Mullumbimby areas of Northern NSW out of depots in Ballina and Billinudgel. Since 2010, it also owned Brunswick Valley Coaches, while retaining the latter's brand.

Blanch's Bus Company and Brunswick Valley Coaches were acquired by ComfortDelGro in April 2019.

As of July 2022, the fleet consists of 49 buses.

Former operations
While CDC NSW was only established in 2017, Westbus was one of the first three New South Wales bus companies to be acquired by ComfortDelgro Cabcharge in 2005.

Westbus 

Westbus was a bus operator who operated bus services in Western Sydney. It was one of the first companies to be bought by ComfortDelGro Cabcharge in 2005. Until its cessation, Westbus' services were part of Sydney Bus Regions 1 and 3. In 2012, these regions were put out to tender by Transport for NSW. Westbus' bids to retain both regions were not successful, with the Region 1 services operating out of St Marys and Windsor passing to Busways, while the Region 3 services operated by Bonnyrigg and Girraween passing to Transit Systems Sydney, both in October 2013. As a result, Westbus ceased to operate routes, with remaining bus fleet transferred to other ComfortDelGro Cabcharge subsidiaries.

References

Australian companies established in 2017
Bus companies of New South Wales
ComfortDelGro companies
Transport companies established in 2017
2017 establishments in Australia